Hernán López may refer to:

 Hernán López (cyclist) (born 1973), Argentine cyclist
 Hernán López (footballer) (born 2000), Argentine footballer